Up'n Away – The Album is the first album by German eurodance group Mr. President, released in March 1995. This album features four hit singles: "Up'n Away", "I'll Follow the Sun", "4 On the Floor" and "Gonna Get Along (Without Ya Now)".

Track listing

Charts

Sales and certifications

References

1995 debut albums
Mr. President (band) albums